Ruth Miller (March 19, 1903 – June 13, 1981) was an American actress, known for The Sheik (1921), The Affairs of Anatol (1921), and The King of Kings (1927).

Filmography
 The Sheik (1921)
 The Affairs of Anatol (1921)
 The Volga Boatman (1926)
 The King of Kings (1927)

References

External links

 

1903 births
1981 deaths
American film actresses
American silent film actresses
20th-century American actresses